Quincy Breell (born 19 April 1992) is an Aruban long jumper. He represented his country at two World Championships, in 2013 and 2015, without qualifying for the final. Before turning to athletics, he was a basketball player.
 
His personal best in the event is 7.72 metres (+1.9 m/s) set in Cartagena in 2015. This is the current national record.

Competition record

References

Male long jumpers
Aruban long jumpers
Living people
Place of birth missing (living people)
1992 births
Aruban male athletes
World Athletics Championships athletes for Aruba
Pan American Games competitors for Aruba
Athletes (track and field) at the 2015 Pan American Games
Athletes (track and field) at the 2019 Pan American Games